The following is a list of Bulgarian wine regions. Wine is, together with beer and grape rakia, among the most popular alcoholic beverages in Bulgaria.

Regions for Production of Regional Wines

 Danubian (Danube) Plain. In the US, this appellation is also approved as Danube River Plains.
 Thracian Lowlands. In the US, this appellation is also approved as Thracian Valley.

Regions with Guaranteed and Controlled Appellation of Origin (GCAO)

Northern Bulgaria
 Black Sea GCAO
 Euxinograd GCAO
 Han Krum GCAO
 Novi Pazar GCAO
 Novo Selo GCAO
 Lovech GCAO
 Lozitsa GCAO
 Lyaskovets GCAO
 Pavlikeni GCAO
 Pleven GCAO
 Rousse GCAO
 Svishtov GCAO
 Varbitsa GCAO
 Vidin GCAO

Southern Bulgaria
 Asenovgrad GCAO
 Brestnik GCAO
 Harsovo GCAO
 Haskovo GCAO
 Hissarya GCAO
 Ivaylovgrad GCAO
 Karnobat GCAO
 Karlovo GCAO
 Lyubimets GCAO
 Melnik GCAO
 Nova Zagora GCAO
 Oryahovitsa GCAO
 Perushtitsa GCAO
 Pomorie GCAO
 Plovdiv GCAO
 Sakar GCAO
 Sandanski GCAO
 Septemvri GCAO
 Shivachevo GCAO
 Sliven GCAO
 Svilengrad GCAO
 Sungurlare GCAO
 South Black Sea GCAO
 Stambolovo GCAO
 Stara Zagora GCAO
 Struma Valley GCAO
 Yambol GCAO

Wine
Wine
Bulgarian wine
Wine regions

de:Weinbau in Bulgarien